Moûtiers-Salins-Brides-les-Bains is a railway station in the Savoie department of Southeastern France. The station, which is located in the town of Moûtiers, is served by three major high-speed services: the TGV, Eurostar and Thalys.

It is the principal gateway point for the Les Trois Vallées ski resorts if travelling by train. Passengers alight at this station and catch the frequent bus services to the various Les Trois Vallées resorts.

Juxtaposed controls are in operation in the station for Eurostar passengers travelling to the UK. They clear exit checks from the Schengen Area (carried out by Customs officers) as well as UK entry checks (conducted by the UK Border Force) in the station before boarding their train.

Services
High speed services (TGV) Paris - Chambéry - Albertville - Bourg-Saint-Maurice
Local services (TER Auvergne-Rhône-Alpes) (Lyon -) Chambéry - St-Pierre-d'Albigny - Albertville - Bourg-Saint-Maurice

These services operate during the winter ski season:
High speed services (Eurostar) London - Bourg-Saint-Maurice
High speed services (Thalys) Amsterdam - Brussels - Chambéry - Bourg-Saint-Maurice

See also
List of border crossing points in France
France–UK border

References

Railway stations in Savoie
Railway stations in France opened in 1893
French railway stations with juxtaposed controls